Stadion Františka Kloze is a multi-use stadium in Kladno, Czech Republic.  It is currently used mostly for football matches and is the home ground of SK Kladno.  The stadium holds 4,000 people and was opened in 1914. It is named after former player František Kloz, situated by the street also named after him.

References
 Photo gallery and data at Erlebnis-stadion.de

Frantiska Kloze
Czech First League venues
SK Kladno
Sport in Kladno
Sports venues completed in 1914
1914 establishments in Austria-Hungary